IOWA is a 2005 American independent neo-noir film directed by, written by, and starring Matt Farnsworth. The film follows two young Iowan lovers who decide to cook their own methamphetamine. Critics gave negative reviews.

Plot
After his father dies, Esper Harte learns that he may collect on his father's insurance.  However, his mother and a crooked cop want to get rid of him so that they can take the money.
Desperate to escape their problems, Esper and his girlfriend, Donna Huffman, decide to cook their own methamphetamine.

Cast
 Matt Farnsworth as Esper Harte
 Diane Foster as Donna Huffman
 Michael T. Weiss as Larry Clarkson
 Rosanna Arquette as Effie Harte
 John Savage as Irv Huffman

Release
IOWA premiered at the Tribeca Film Festival on April 22, 2005.

Reception
The film received negative reviews.  Rotten Tomatoes reports 15% of surveyed critics liked it, with a 3.9/10 rating average out of 13 reviews.  Metacritic gave it a score of 35/100, indicating "generally unfavorable reviews".

Slant Magazine called the film "stupendously slipshod" and "meandering, amateurish sleaze", while The New York Times criticized the lack of subtlety. In a more positive review, The Village Voice praised the film's energy and acting.  Monsters and Critics said "This story and the characters in it are as real as the day is long and faithful to all that is good and bad about growing up with ever shrinking horizons."

References

External links
 
 
 

2005 films
American independent films
2005 drama films
Films set in Iowa
2000s English-language films
2000s American films